Colores Santos (Spanish for "Holy Colors") is an album released by Argentine musicians Gustavo Cerati and Daniel Melero under the name Cerati/Melero in 1992. The album was recorded and released previous to Soda Stereo's album Dynamo (also influenced by Melero's state-of-the-art musical exploration), at the peak of the band's popularity. The album has a strong electronic influence which would inform Dynamo and help kickstart the electronic rock scene in Argentina. 
Allmusic critic Iván Adaime wrote that "Somehow this album was like a UFO in the Argentine early-'90s rock scene".

Track listing

Personnel
 Gustavo Cerati & Daniel Melero - Instruments and vocals
 Flavio Etcheto - Trumpet on Madre Tierra.
 Carola Bony - Vocals on Pudo Ser and Colores Santos''.

References

External links
 Vuelta Por el Universo music video
 Hoy Ya No Soy Yo music video
 Making-of Colores Santos video (fragment)
 Gustavo Cerati's official page information about Colores Santos

Gustavo Cerati albums
Experimental pop albums